OrthoFinder is a command-line software tool for comparative genomics. OrthoFinder determines the correspondence between genes in different organisms (also known as orthology analysis). This correspondence provides a framework for understanding the evolution of life on Earth, and enables the extrapolation and transfer of biological knowledge between organisms. 

OrthoFinder takes FASTA files of protein sequences as input (one per species) and as output provides:
 Orthogroups
 Rooted Phylogenetic trees of all orthogroups
 A rooted species tree for the set of species included in the input dataset
 Hierarchical orthogroups for each node in the species tree
 Orthologs between all species
 Gene duplication events mapped to branches in the species tree
 Comparative genomic statistics

As of August 2021, the tool has been referenced by more than 1500 published studies.

See also
 Bioinformatics
 Homology (biology)
 Sequence homology
 Protein family
 Sequence clustering

References

Evolutionary biology
Bioinformatics software
Phylogenetics